Kim Sung-yeon (born 30 January 1989 in South Korea) is a Korean attacking midfielder. He currently plays for BBCU F.C. in the Thai Premier League.

Football activities 
Born in Republic of Korea to study in Brazil was Oscar Soccer Academy.
Brazilian first division team in 2008 Figueirense FC and signed a full Youth contract.
Brazil in 2009, and a formal agreement was Gremio Esportivo Juventus in professional contract 2010,
was transferred to Caxias Futebol Clube. Mokpo City2012 South Korea joined the league for the first time entered the league in 2013 Persepam Madura United Indonesia has joined this BBCU F.C. 2013 Thailand joined the League succeeded in being active.

References

1989 births
Living people
South Korean footballers
South Korean expatriate footballers
Liga 1 (Indonesia) players
Expatriate footballers in Brazil
Expatriate footballers in Indonesia
Expatriate footballers in Thailand
South Korean expatriate sportspeople in Brazil
South Korean expatriate sportspeople in Indonesia
South Korean expatriate sportspeople in Thailand
Association football midfielders
Grêmio Esportivo Juventus players
Caxias Futebol Clube players
Persepam Madura Utama players
Kim Sung-yeon